Kelm is either a German language topographic or a habitational surname, in the first case denoting a person who lived near a hill (Old Slavic cholm "peak", "hill") or in the second case someone who came from Chełm in eastern Poland or from any of several similar named smaller settlement. Notable people with the surname include:

Annette Kelm (1975), German artist and photographer 
Arthur Andrew Kelm (1931–2018), American actor, singer, film producer and author
Bernhard Kelm (1967), retired German long jumper
Duncan Kelm (1988), American rugby union player 
Dustin Kelm (1972), American unicyclist
Erna Kelm (1908–1962), German victim of the Berlin Wall
Erwin Kelm (1911–1994), American businessman
Gabriele Kelm (1872–1921), German rower
George L. Kelm (1931–2019), American archaeologist
Larry Kelm (1964–2014), American football player
Viktor Kelm (1997), Kyrgyz footballer

References

See also
 Chelm (disambiguation)
 Kelme (disambiguation)

German-language surnames
German toponymic surnames